Ardery is a village in Acharacle in Lochaber, Argyll, located a quarter mile from the north shore of Loch Sunart in the Highland, and is in the Scottish council area of the Highland Scotland.

References

Populated places in Lochaber